Ferreiros is a Portuguesae Freguesia in the Municipality of Póvoa de Lanhoso, with and area of 4.88 km² and 416 inhabitants as of 2011. The population density is 85.2 people per km².

Population

References 

Freguesias of Póvoa de Lanhoso